Leucicorus is a small genus of cusk-eels found in deep oceanic waters. It contains two species, one from the western Atlantic and the other from the eastern Pacific.

Species
There are currently two recognized species in this genus:
 Leucicorus atlanticus J. G. Nielsen, 1975
 Leucicorus lusciosus Garman, 1899

References

Ophidiidae